Mudi Sooda Mannan is a 1978 Indian Tamil-language film produced and directed by R. Vittal, and written by Thooyavan. The film stars Jaishankar and Sridevi, with Y. Vijaya, Deepa, Sarath Babu, M. N. Nambiar, R. S. Manohar and S. A. Ashokan in supporting roles. It was released on 15 September 1978.

Plot

Cast 
 Jaishankar as Vikraman
 Sridevi as Roopa
 Y. Vijaya as Nandini
 Deepa as Pratima
 Sarath Babu as Bhairavan
 M. N. Nambiar as Rajaguru
 R. S. Manohar
 S. A. Ashokan

Soundtrack 
The music was composed by Satyam.

Reception 
P. S. M. of Kalki criticised the film for lack of originality, and felt Manohar and Ashokan were wasted.

References

External links 
 

1970s Tamil-language films
Films about royalty
Films scored by Satyam (composer)